The 2003 Sharpie 500 was the 24th stock car race of the 2003 NASCAR Winston Cup Series season and the 43rd iteration of the event. The race was held on Saturday, August 23, 2003, before a crowd of 160,000 in Bristol, Tennessee at Bristol Motor Speedway, a 0.533 miles (0.858 km) permanent oval-shaped racetrack. The race took the scheduled 500 laps to complete. At race's end, Kurt Busch of Roush Racing would win a caution-filled event, with 20 cautions that matched the track record to win his seventh career NASCAR Winston Cup Series win and his third and final win of the season. To fill out the podium, Kevin Harvick of Richard Childress Racing and Jamie McMurray of Chip Ganassi Racing would finish second and third, respectively.

Background 

The Bristol Motor Speedway, formerly known as Bristol International Raceway and Bristol Raceway, is a NASCAR short track venue located in Bristol, Tennessee. Constructed in 1960, it held its first NASCAR race on July 30, 1961. Despite its short length, Bristol is among the most popular tracks on the NASCAR schedule because of its distinct features, which include extraordinarily steep banking, an all concrete surface, two pit roads, and stadium-like seating. It has also been named one of the loudest NASCAR tracks.

Entry list

Practice 
Originally, three practice sessions were going to be held, with all three being held on Friday, August 22. However, due to a long rain delay during qualifying, the second practice session was canceled.

First practice 
The first practice session was held on Friday, August 22, at 11:20 AM EST, and would last for two hours.

Second and final practice 
The second and final practice session, sometimes referred to as Happy Hour, was held on Friday, August 22, at 6:15 PM EST, and would last for 45 minutes.

Qualifying 
Qualifying was held on Friday, August 22, at 3:05 PM EST. Each driver would have two laps to set a fastest time; the fastest of the two would count as their official qualifying lap. Positions 1-36 would be decided on time, while positions 37-43 would be based on provisionals. Six spots are awarded by the use of provisionals based on owner's points. The seventh is awarded to a past champion who has not otherwise qualified for the race. If no past champ needs the provisional, the next team in the owner points will be awarded a provisional.

Hermie Sadler, Billy Bigley, Derrike Cope, and Morgan Shepherd would fail to qualify.

Full qualifying results

Race results

References 

2003 NASCAR Winston Cup Series
NASCAR races at Bristol Motor Speedway
August 2003 sports events in the United States
2003 in sports in Tennessee